Daniel Kreutzer (born October 23, 1979) is a German retired professional ice hockey forward who spent most of his career with Düsseldorfer EG of the Deutsche Eishockey Liga (DEL).

Career 
Having come through the youth ranks of Düsseldorfer EG, Kreutzer made his debut in the German top-flight Deutsche Eishockey Liga (DEL) in the 1996-97 season. After spending time with Revier Löwen Oberhausen and the Kassel Huskies between 1997 and 2002, he returned to Düsseldorf and became a pillar of the DEG side. Kreutzer reached the finals with the Düsseldorf team in 2006 and 2009, but would never win the German championship. A long-time DEG team captain, he appeared in a total of 1060 DEL contests, scoring 270 goals, while assisting on 529 more. He announced his retirement on August 17, 2017. Internationally, Kreutzer won 201 caps for the German men's national team, participating in the 2002 and 2006 Olympic Games and several world championships.

Career statistics

Regular season and playoffs

International

References

External links 
 

1979 births
Living people
DEG Metro Stars players
Düsseldorfer EG players
Füchse Duisburg players
German ice hockey right wingers
Ice hockey players at the 2002 Winter Olympics
Ice hockey players at the 2006 Winter Olympics
Kassel Huskies players
Olympic ice hockey players of Germany
Revier Löwen players
Sportspeople from Düsseldorf